The 2014–15 season was the 67th season in the existence of FC Steaua București and the club's 67th consecutive season in the top flight of Romanian football. In addition to the domestic league, Steaua București participated in this season's edition of the Cupa României, the Cupa Ligii, the Supercupa României, the UEFA Champions League and the UEFA Europa League.

Players

First-team squad

Players from youth team

Transfers

In

Out

Statistics

Goalscorers
Last updated on 31 May 2015 (UTC)

Competitions

Supercupa României

Results

Liga I

League table

Results summary

Position by round

Matches

Cupa României

Results

Cupa Ligii

Results

UEFA Champions League

Qualifying rounds

Second qualifying round

Third qualifying round

Play-off round

UEFA Europa League

Group stage

Results

Non competitive matches

See also

 2014 Supercupa României
 2014–15 Cupa României
 2014–15 Liga I
 2014–15 UEFA Champions League
 2014–15 UEFA Europa League

Notes and references

FC Steaua București seasons
Steaua Bucuresti
Steaua
Romanian football championship-winning seasons